Utopian Essays and Practical Proposals is a 1962 book of essays on social issues by Paul Goodman.

References

External links 

 

1962 non-fiction books
American essay collections
Books by Paul Goodman
English-language books
Random House books